Lunularia cruciata, the crescent-cup liverwort,  is a liverwort of the order Marchantiales (until recently included in the order  Lunulariales), and the only species in the genus Lunularia and family Lunulariaceae. The name, from Latin luna, moon, refers to the moon-shaped gemma cups.

Distribution 
L. cruciata is distributed across the world, found in continents including Europe, Australasia, Asia, the Americas, and Africa. It occurs commonly in western Europe, and is native to the Mediterranean region, where the morphological forms from sexual reproduction are more frequently found there. It is also common in California, where it now grows "wild", and is known as an introduced weed in gardens and greenhouses in Australia. Ella Orr Campbell believed that L. cruciata was introduced into New Zealand sometime after 1867. The sporophytes of L. cruciata are rare, but has been found in European regions, as well as in South Africa, Argentina, California, India, Japan and New Zealand.

Habitat and ecology 
L. cruciata grows in damp, shaded and disturbed habitats such as path and wall edges. It can act as a nutrient indicator because it often grows in alkaline and eutrophic to highly eutrophic soil. Other habitats include loam, boulders, concrete, exposed tree roots, soil covered logs and in the gaps between sidewalk stones. L. cruciata also grows as a horticultural weed in gardens, greenhouses and parks. L. cruciata is sensitive to frost, and is often found near water, where its gemmae are washed ashore.

Morphology 
L. cruciata grows large, dichotomously branched green thalli with crescent shaped gemma cups containing disc like gemmae. This is a unique morphological characteristic not possessed by other thalloid liverworts. Its thallus surface is shiny, faintly lined, and is dotted with tiny air pores. When dried the thallus turns yellowish in color and its margin rolls inward.

Reproduction 
As in other liverworts, the main plant body or thallus is a haploid gametophyte. The antheridia of L. cruciata develops in early spring, the archegonia develops in spring and sporophytes develop in late summer. However, records of sporophyte developments and sexual reproduction are rare and scattered. This was suspected to have been the result of the anthropogenic spreading of this species, causing a disjunctive distribution of antheridia and archegonia. When reproducing sexually, the four archegonia is arranged in a cross-shaped head (hence the specific name cruciata) bearing diploid sporophyte plantlets. When reproducing asexually, the disc-shaped gemmae are readily dislodged from the cups by splashes of rainwater. They can then quickly "take root" and start to grow in suitably damp places, which is why they are so successful in greenhouses.

Chemical properties 
Like many other liverwort species, L. cruciata produces a dihydrostilbenoid growth hormone, lunularic acid, that is reported to be a growth inhibitor of liverworts. Cadmium in this liverwort also inhibits gemma germination and apical thallus growth, as well as altering cell and chloroplast structure. Acetone extracts from L. cruciata were tested and showed antibacterial properties, but had no effects against fungal activity.

References

External links
 
  USDA information 
  Photos
  Information and pictures

Liverworts
Monotypic bryophyte genera
Bryophyta of North America
Flora of Europe
Flora of California
Flora of New Zealand
Liverwort genera